Splendor was a Belgian professional cycling team that existed from 1975 to 1989. It won the team classification of the 1980 Vuelta a España.

References

Cycling teams based in Belgium
Defunct cycling teams based in Belgium
1975 establishments in Belgium
1989 disestablishments in Belgium
Cycling teams established in 1975
Cycling teams disestablished in 1989